AE Mesogis  is a Cypriot football team currently playing in the Cypriot Fourth Division.
The team is established in Mesogi near Paphos.

The club has played one season in the Cypriot Second Division.

League participations
Cypriot Second Division: 2006–2007
Cypriot Third Division: 2007–?
Cypriot Fourth Division: ?

Achievements
Cypriot Third Division: 2005–06
Cypriot Fourth Division: 2001–02

References

External links
 Futbol24

Defunct football clubs in Cyprus